Ryan Lucas (born 31 August 1977) is a Barbadian footballer who played the majority of his career in North America and for the Barbados national football team.

Playing career
Lucas began his career with Galway United in the League of Ireland Premier Division in 1997. In 2001, he played in the USL D-3 Pro League with the Boston Bulldogs, and scored 6 goals in 11 appearances. The following season he featured in the USL A-League with the Cincinnati Riverhawks, and recorded eight goals in 13 matches. For the remainder of the season he played for Toronto Lynx. After the 2002 season came to a conclusion he was loaned to the Mississauga Olympians of the Canadian Professional Soccer League; making his debut on September 6, 2002 in a match against North York Astros, and scored his first goal in a 2-1 defeat. In his two seasons with the Lynx he appeared in 34 matches and scored seven goals.

In 2004, he returned to his native Barbados to play with Notre Dame SC of the Barbados Premier Division. With Notre Dame his achievements were claiming the Barbados Premier Division championships in 2004, and 2005; as well as the Barbados FA Cup in 2004.

International career
Lucas played for the  Barbadian national team between 2000 and 2007, which included several FIFA World Cup qualifying matches.

Honors
Barbados Premier Division: 2
 2004, 2005

Barbados FA Cup: 1
 2004

References

1977 births
Living people
Barbadian footballers
Barbadian expatriate footballers
Barbados international footballers
Boston Bulldogs (soccer) players
Cincinnati Riverhawks players
Galway United F.C. (1937–2011) players
Toronto Lynx players
Toronto (Mississauga) Olympians players
Notre Dame SC players
Canadian Soccer League (1998–present) players
A-League (1995–2004) players
Sportspeople from Bridgetown
Expatriate association footballers in the Republic of Ireland
Expatriate soccer players in Canada
Expatriate soccer players in the United States
Barbadian expatriate sportspeople in the United States
Barbadian expatriate sportspeople in Canada
Barbadian expatriate sportspeople in Ireland
Association football forwards